The 2023 ICC Cricket World Cup Challenge Play-off is an upcoming cricket tournament scheduled to take place in 2023, to decide the final four places in the Cricket World Cup Challenge League for the next World Cup cycle. The host of the tournament and the status of the matches have yet to be confirmed. It will feature the bottom four teams from the 2019–2022 ICC Cricket World Cup Challenge League along with an additional four sides (who are hoping to come up from below). These four "new" countries will probably be the top four ranked in the ICC T20I Championship who did not take part in the 2023 Cricket World Cup qualification process. The best four sides emerging from this "Challenge Play-off" competition will then qualify to complete the twelve-team World Cup Challenge League field for the next cycle.

Teams and qualification
In the Challenge Play-off, the bottom two teams from each of the two groups in the Challenge League will join four others from outside the 32-team qualification process. These others will represent the top four countries who meet the following entry requirements:
[i] They must have a minimum of eight domestic teams playing regular cricket, including at least five 40+-over matches in each of the two previous years; 
[ii] They should be in the top 40 of the ICC T20I Championship rankings as of 31 December 2022.

References

International cricket competitions